Periya Mariamman Temple (Tamil:பெரிய மாரியம்மன் திருக்கோயில்) is located near Panneer Selvam Park, opposite to Erode Corporation Building in the city of Erode, Tamil Nadu, India. It is dedicated to Mariamman, the Hindu Goddess. Kongu Cholas built the temple 1200 years ago.

Group Temples
Along with this Periya Mariamman Temple, the Devasthanam includes two other temples in the city.
 Chinna Mariamman Temple in Periyar Street
 Vaikkal Mariamman Temple at Karaivakkal
Also, there are lot many other Mariamman temples inside the city including Karungalpalayam Mariamman, Nadu Mariamman, Narayana Valasu Mariamman, Kumulankuttai Mariamman, Ellai Mariamman. But, Periya Mariamman in worshipped as the Head of all Mariammans in the City.

Festivals
Every year, during the Tamil month of Panguni (March- April), a grand festival is celebrated in the City. The festival will start in the first Tuesday of Panguni simultaneously at Periya Mariamman, Chinna Mariamman and Vaikkal Mariamman Temples. The other activities in the celebration includes
 Kambam Naduthal 
 Maa vilakku 
 Karagam Eduthal 
 Pongal 
 Therottam (Temple Car procession)
 Manjal Neerattu
The celebrations happen for 20 days between Kambam Naduthal and Manjal Neerattu.

See also
Bannari Amman Temple
Mariamman temples

References

External links
 Mariamman Temple-Erode

Mariamman temples
Hindu temples in Erode district